Adenta is a small town and is the capital of Adenta Municipal district, a district in the Greater Accra Region of Ghana. The town is known for the West Africa Secondary School. The school is a second cycle institution. It is also known for the SSNIT (Social Secutiry and National Trust Insurance) Housing. It is located on the Accra - Aburi Highway after Madina.

References

Populated places in the Greater Accra Region